The Algerian Volleyball Federation (FAVB), is the governing body for Volleyball in Algeria since 1962.

History
The Algerian Federation has been recognised by FIVB from 1962 and is a member of the African Volleyball Confederation.

References

External links
FAVB official website

Volleyball in Algeria
Volleyball
Sports organizations established in 1962
National members of the African Volleyball Confederation
1962 establishments in Algeria